Marion Edwin Warren (June 18, 1920 – September 8, 2006) was an American photographer, best known for his black-and-white photographs of the Chesapeake Bay and its Maryland surroundings. His work appeared in Fortune, Life, Time, National Geographic and Sports Illustrated.

References

External links
 Official website and works showcase

20th-century American photographers
Maryland culture
Chesapeake Bay
1920 births
2006 deaths